Guyingpan railway station  is a station of Jingbao Railway in near Jining, Inner Mongolia, China.

See also
 List of stations on Jingbao railway

Railway stations in Inner Mongolia
Qahar Right Front Banner